The 2005–06 Football League (known as the Coca-Cola Football League for sponsorship reasons) was the 107th completed season of The Football League.

This season saw Reading promoted to the top flight for the first time in their history, after winning the Championship with 106 points – a record for a 46-match season with three points for a win. Southend United were the champions of League One, while Carlisle United, having played in the Conference in 2004–05, completed a double promotion by winning League Two.

Promotion and Relegation
These are the changes that happened last season.

From Premier League
Relegated to Championship
 Norwich City
 Crystal Palace
 Southampton

From Championship
Promoted to Premier League
 Sunderland
 Wigan Athletic
 West Ham United

Relegated to League 1
 Gillingham
 Nottingham Forest
 Rotherham United

From Football League One
Promoted to Championship
 Luton Town
 Hull City
 Sheffield Wednesday

Relegated to League 2
 Peterborough United
 Stockport County
 Torquay United
 Wrexham

From Football League Two
Promoted to League 1
 Yeovil Town
 Scunthorpe United
 Swansea City
 Southend United

Relegated to Conference National
 Cambridge United
 Kidderminster Harriers

From Conference National
Promoted to League 2
 Barnet
 Carlisle United

Final league tables and results 

The tables below are reproduced here in the exact form that they can be found at The Rec.Sport.Soccer Statistics Foundation website, with home and away statistics separated. Play-off results are from the same website.

Championship

Play-offs

Top scorers

League One

Play-offs

Top scorers

League Two

Play-offs

Top scorers

See also
English Football League
2005–06 in English football
2005 in association football
2006 in association football

References

External links
Football League Tables

 
2005-06